Tsuen Wan Rural Committee is a rural committee representing the interest of villages in Tsuen Wan and Kwai Chung, Hong Kong.

Note that Tsing Yi Island and Ma Wan has its own rural committees, Tsing Yi Rural Committee and Ma Wan Rural Committee respectively.

Villages
The villages represented within Tsuen Wan Rural Committee are:
 Chuen Lung
 Chung Kwai Chung
 Ha Fa Shan
 Ham Tin
 Ho Pui
 Hoi Pa (Cheung Pei Shan Road)
 Hoi Pa (South Platform)
 Hoi Pa (Wo Yi Hop Road and Kwok Shui Road)
 Kwan Mun Hau
 Kwu Hang
 Lo Wai
 Ma Sim Pai
 Muk Min Ha
 Pai Min Kok
 Pak Tin Pa
 Sai Lau Kok
 Sam Tung Uk
 San Tsuen
 Sham Tseng
 Shek Pik San Tsuen
 Shek Wai Kok
 Sheung Kwai Chung
 
 Ting Kau
 Tsing Fai Tong
 Tsing Lung Tau
 Tsuen Wan Sam Tsuen
 Wo Yi Hop
 Yau Kam Tau
 Yeung Uk
 Yi Pei Chun
 Yuen Tun

References

Tsuen Wan
Kwai Chung
Rural Committees